Louisa Lausanne (1891–1964) was a Belgian film actress.

Selected filmography
 Met den helm geboren (1939)
 Janssens tegen Peeters (1939)
 Janssens en Peeters dikke vrienden (1940)
 Antoon, de flierefluiter (1942)
 Schipperskwartier (1953)
 De stille genieter (1961)

Bibliography
 Thys, Marianne. Belgian Cinema. Royal Belgian Film Archive, 1999.

External links

1891 births
1964 deaths
Belgian film actresses
Actors from Antwerp
20th-century Belgian actresses